Dona Sarkar is a software engineer, a multi-published author, a public speaker and the owner of a fashion business.

She is the Director of Technology for Microsoft Accessibility. Previously, she led an advocacy team for the Power Platform, a low-code/no-code development platform at Microsoft. She is the former head of the Windows Insider software testing group at Microsoft, which she led from 2016 to 2019.

Sarkar attended University of Michigan, where she studied computer science.

In June 2016, Sarkar replaced Gabe Aul as the head of the Windows Insider public testing group. One of her most notable projects was increasing the engagement with customers in emerging markets such as East and West Africa. She and her team created an entrepreneurship bootcamp for startup founders in Nigeria, Kenya, Uganda, Tanzania and Rwanda to better understand the tech needs for those starting and growing businesses. She co-authored a book, Model 47: A Startup Storybook, an entrepreneurship bible of sorts based on her experiences on this project.

She is a notable public speaker, known for topics around mental health in the workplace, Digital Accessibility, getting out of one's comfort zone and overcoming imposter syndrome. She has appeared on hundreds of stages around the world, including at the United Nations, World Economic Forum and TEDx.

in 2009, Dona started an ethically-created fashion line called Prima Dona based in Seattle, Washington.

References

External links
 

Living people
Nepalese emigrants to the United States
Microsoft employees
University of Michigan alumni
1980 births